Now That's What I Call Quite Good was the post-breakup greatest hits album from The Housemartins, released in 1988. As well as singles (such as the UK number one "Caravan of Love"), the compilation includes various album tracks, B-sides and radio session recordings. It includes many humorous liner notes from the band (for example, numerous sales and chart position statistics – but only from New Zealand).

Track listing
"I Smell Winter" – 3:23  B-side of the "Think for a Minute" 12" single.
"Bow Down" – 3:01  From The People Who Grinned Themselves to Death.
"Think for a Minute!" – 3:29  Single version.
"There is Always Something There to Remind Me" – 3:30  John Peel Session 4/11/87.  Released as a single.
"The Mighty Ship" – 1:50  B-side of the "Happy Hour" single/12".
"Sheep" – 2:16  From London 0 Hull 4.
"I'll Be Your Shelter (Just Like a Shelter)" – 4:46  Luther Ingram cover.  B-side of the "Sheep" 12".
"Five Get Over Excited" – 2:41  from The People Who Grinned Themselves to Death.
"Everyday's the Same" – 2:56  1987 outtake.
"Build" – 4:48  from The People Who Grinned Themselves to Death.
"Step Outside" – 4:13  B-side of the "Me and the Farmer" 12".
"Flag Day" – 3:32  Original single version.
"Happy Hour" – 2:22  From London 0 Hull 4.
"You've Got a Friend" – 3:30 Carole King cover.  Previously unreleased demo.
"He Ain't Heavy, He's My Brother" – 2:47  Kelly Gordon/The Hollies cover.  Capital Radio Session 13/3/86.
"Freedom" – 3:27  Janice Long Session 6/11/85.
"The People Who Grinned Themselves to Death" – 3:30  From The People Who Grinned Themselves to Death.
"Caravan of Love" – 3:39  Isley-Jasper-Isley cover.  Non-album single.
"The Light is Always Green" – 3:58  from The People Who Grinned Themselves to Death.
"We're Not Deep" – 2:15  From London 0 Hull 4.
"Me and the Farmer" – 2:54  From The People Who Grinned Themselves to Death.
"Lean on Me" – 4:27  From London 0 Hull 4.
"Drop Down Dead" – 3:01  John Peel Session 21/7/85.
"Hopelessly Devoted to Them" – 2:10  B-side of the "Five Get Over Excited" 12".

Charts

Certifications

References

The Housemartins compilation albums
1988 compilation albums
Go! Discs compilation albums